The European Union maintains delegations with the rank of embassy in many third countries, but there are delegations that are accredited to more than one foreign state. In some cases the accreditation country also hosts a consulate rank EU diplomatic office.

Accreditations

Similarly to ambassadors there are heads of delegations accredited to additional countries, besides their country of residence. Countries with accredited head of delegation resident elsewhere, that are hosts to an office subordinate to another delegation are marked with *.
 (from Switzerland delegation)
 (from the delegation to the UN organisations in Rome)
 (from the delegation to the UN organisations in Rome)
 (from the delegation to the UN organisations in Rome)
 (from India delegation)
 (from Indonesia delegation)
 (from Gabon delegation)
 (from Gabon delegation)
 (from Sri Lanka delegation)
 (from Mauritius delegation)
 (from Mauritius delegation)
 (from Saudi Arabia delegation)
 (from Saudi Arabia delegation)
* (from Guyana delegation)
 (from Barbados delegation)
 (from Barbados delegation)
 (from Barbados delegation)
 (from Barbados delegation)
 (from Barbados delegation)
 (from Barbados delegation)
 (from Fiji delegation)
 (from Fiji delegation)
 (from Fiji delegation)
 (from Fiji delegation)
 (from Fiji delegation)
 (from Fiji delegation)
 (from Fiji delegation)
 (NZ associated state) (from Fiji delegation)

Responsibilities

Some delegations are responsible for European Union activities and relations with third countries that have not established diplomatic relations with the EU and for special territories of EU member states, including some that are part of the EU itself (OMR). Territories that host office subordinate to such delegation are marked with *.
 (NZ associated state) (Fiji delegation)
 (UK OCT) (Jamaica delegation)
 (UK OCT) (Jamaica delegation)
 (Netherlands OCT) (Guyana delegation)
 (Netherlands OCT) (Guyana delegation)
 (UK OCT) (Barbados delegation)
 (UK OCT) (Barbados delegation)
 (UK OCT) (Barbados delegation)
 (France OMR) (Barbados delegation)
 (France OMR) (Barbados delegation)
 (France OMR) (Barbados delegation)
 (France OCT) (Mauritius delegation)
 (France OMR) (Mauritius delegation)
 (France OCT)*  (Fiji delegation)
 (France OCT) (Fiji delegation)
 (France OCT) (Fiji delegation)
 (UK OCT) (Fiji delegation)

See also
 List of diplomatic missions of the European Union
 Ambassadors of the European Union
 List of diplomatic missions to the European Union
 Foreign relations of the European Union
 European External Action Service

References

External links
 EU Delegations worldwide
 External Relations Directorate of the European Commission
 External Service Directory - accreditations and responsibilities

Diplomatic missions
Diplomatic missions of the European Union